Mamdouh Adwan (23 November 1941 – 19 December 2004) was a prolific Syrian writer, poet, playwright and critic. He published his first collection of poetry, al-Dhul al-Akhdhar [The Green Shadow] in 1967 and afterwards published 18 further collections. 

He also published two novels, twenty-five plays, translated twenty-three books from English into Arabic, including the Iliad, the Odyssey, a biography of George Orwell, the Report to Greco by Nikos Kazantzakis, and wrote a number of television series. He wrote regularly on Arab current affairs, and also taught at the Higher Institute for Dramatic Arts in Damascus. Only few of his works have been published in English, notably in Banipal magazine.

Biography
Mamdouh Adwan was born in the village of Qayrun near Masyaf, Hama Governorate, the first child of Sabri Adwan. After finishing his schooling in Masyaf, he moved to Damascus to study English literature at Damascus University. He was married and has two sons.

Works in English translation 

 The old man and the land. Damascus : al-Tawjih Press, 1971.
 Selected poems. (2008) translated by Sinan Antoon, Banipal 32

References

Further reading 

 Darraj, Faisal (2004). Mamdouh Adwan and the freedom of the prolific creator. Banipal 21, autumn/winter 

1941 births
2004 deaths
Damascus University alumni
Syrian dramatists and playwrights
Syrian literary critics
Syrian poets
Syrian translators
Syrian Alawites
20th-century translators